Melania the Younger ( 383 - 31 December 439) is a Christian saint and Desert Mother who lived during the reign of Emperor Honorius, son of Theodosius I.  She is the paternal granddaughter of Melania the Elder.

The Feast of Melania the Younger is held on 31 December (the Julian calendar's 31 December falls on 13 January on the Gregorian calendar). In Ukraine, by Orthodox Christians, Malanka ("Melania's Day") is celebrated on 13 January, and on 31 December by other Christians.

Life

Rome

Melania was the only child of the rich and powerful Valerius Publicola (son of Melania the Elder) and his wife Caeionia Albina, both Christians, of the senatorial Valeria gens family of ancient lineage which was the pride of Rome. Her paternal and maternal relatives had held the highest offices of state with great distinction during the whole of the century, and Melania could even boast of a long line of imperial blood, most recently through Valerius Romulus (r. 308-309).

She was married to her paternal cousin, Valerius Pinianus, at the age of fourteen despite her protests. Gerontius says:

After the early deaths of two children, she and her husband embraced Christian asceticism and maintained a celibate life thereafter. As the sole heiress of her father and paternal grandfather, she inherited their wealth and enormous estates on the death of Publicola after 7 years marriage.

Melania also decided to leave the palace for one of her villas in the suburbs in Spring 404, encouraged by her grandmother, Melania the Elder, who had travelled from Jerusalem and also held strong ascetic beliefs. Her dislike of rich apparel which had caused her so much suffering during her father's life, now led her to give away her silken robes as church altarcloths, her gold ornaments, and everything that was rich and costly in her attire. She wore a garment of coarse wool of the cheapest kind, and fashioned rather to hide and disfigure her beautiful form. She took with her to her villa a great number of poor families and slaves, whom she treated as brothers and sisters.

The villa of the Valerii must have been of enormous size, as it was large enough to lodge the immense number of people whom Melania took with her from Rome, consisting, as we gather from bishop Palladius, of fifteen eunuchs, sixty young girls who were vowed to virginity, with other free-born women, slaves, and more than thirty families who had followed Pinianus in his new mode of life. But in addition to these regular guests, Melania's country house afforded hospitality to the pilgrims to Rome, especially numerous deputations of bishops and priests who were received with every mark of honour and respect in the latter end of 404 and the beginning of 405, to plead the cause of John Chrysostom with Pope Innocent I. She dispensed lavish hospitality and spared no expense in the entertainment of her guests; Palladius speaks with great gratitude of the respectful welcome and the generous hospitality with which he was entertained during his sojourn, and of the large sum of money presented to him on his departure in February 406.
 
She decided to dispose of her vast estates and give the proceeds to ecclesiastical institutions and to the poor. This caused surprise and contempt amongst the Roman aristocracy who regarded the couple as lunatics; some of their relatives considered that they had now an opportunity to enrich themselves beyond all expectation by taking advantage of the simplicity and inexperience of the couple. Melania's appeal to "Queen" Serena and Emperor Honorius led him to order every province that their possessions should be sold at the responsibility of the governors and public administrators, and that they be responsible for the remittance of the price to the couple.

The sale of such enormous estates must inevitably have taken several years to complete as even the smallest of Melania's properties yielded an income of almost fabulous amount. Part of their estates remained unsold at the end of 408 owing to the invasion of the Goths and siege of Rome, and their opponents contrived to take advantage of the critical state of affairs, with the secret co-operation of the senate, by confiscating the remaining estates to the Treasury. They were supported in their plot by the prefect, Pompeianus, and the bill of confiscation had already been drafted, but on the very day when it was to be proclaimed by the prefect, the people rose in rebellion due to the shortage of bread, seized Pompeianus, dragged him through the streets and put him to death in the centre of the city.

None of even the wealthiest Roman patricians had enough cash to buy Melania's properties, and the eventual purchasers were unable to pay the full price at once, the owners being obliged to accept promissory notes. Melania's palace on the Caelian Hill, of which she was anxious from the very first to dispose, was so magnificent and contained such an accumulation of riches that it was impossible to find a purchaser for it. It remained unsold, and in 410, after it had been pillaged by Alaric's barbarian hordes and partly destroyed by fire, it was given away for nothing.

Sicily and Africa

Melania and Pinianus left Rome with her mother Albina and Rufinus of Aquileia, an old friend of the family, in 408, living a monastic life near Messina (Sicily) for two years in the magnificent villa (probably that at Pistunina) they owned on the western shore of the straits, opposite Reggio Calabria, surrounded by immense beauty by both sea and land.

Meanwhile Melania was occupied in disposing of her remaining property, the proceeds of which she distributed, as usual, in alms and other donations. After the taking of Rome by Alaric I, the invaders marched upon Southern Italy, and destroyed Reggio, together with its enchanting suburbs, the fires of which Melania witnessed from across the straits.

No doubt fear of the invaders drove Melania to seek a safer refuge and Africa was regarded as a safe haven by many Roman families who had already emigrated to Carthage. Having already sold many of her possessions in Italy and Sicily and after the death of Rufinus in 410, they decided to travel to Africa. First they attempted to pay a last visit to Paulinus of Nola on the way but, according to the account of Gerontius of Jerusalem, a storm forced the ship to an unnamed island (probably Lipari) that had lately been ravaged by pirates who were now holding the inhabitants for ransom. Melania ransomed the islanders with her own money. Afterwards they continued directly to Africa, where they befriended the great Augustine of Hippo and devoted themselves to a life of piety and charitable works. 

Rather than at a city such as Carthage or Hippo, they chose to live in relative calm at their estate, near Tagaste in present Algeria, which was of such extent and importance as to include two episcopal sees, one belonging to the Catholic Church, the other to the Donatists. Some of the rooms of the villa were "filled with gold". Alypius was the famous bishop there with whom they became friends and who had close relations with Paulinus and Augustine. Alypus had helped establish Augustine's first monastery in Africa. The church in Tagaste had been very poor but Melania furnished it with gold and silver cups, and with altar-cloths richly embroidered in gold and thickly sewn with pearls. She also endowed this church with extensive property including a large part of the town itself. On the advice of the principal bishops Augustine, Alypius, and Aurelius of Carthage, she also was generous to the other churches and monasteries in Africa to which she assigned a regular income to make them independent of precarious alms-giving.

They stayed for seven years and founded a convent for the consecrated virgins who were once her slaves, but who  were treated as her sisters, and of which Melania became Mother Superior, and also founded a cloister of which Pinianus took charge.

In the so-called Pinain affair, Melania's mother Albina wrote to Augustine asking him to visit them, but he would not leave his church. As a result, Albina, Alypus, Melania and Pinianus travelled to him in Hippo. Once there, the congregation became frenzied and demanded that Pinianus be ordained as priest of Hippo and he was forced to swear that he would remain there. Augustine threatened that he would leave as bishop.

She practised severe penance and wore haircloth, and at night she snatched a few brief moments of rest on the hard ground as her bed. Her diet consisted of herbs or vegetables prepared with a little oil.

Palestine

In 417, they travelled to Palestine by way of Alexandria. In Palestine, they lived in a hermitage near the Mount of Olives, where Melania founded a second convent. After the death of Pinianus c. 420, Melania built a cloister for men, and a church, where she spent the remainder of her life.

Properties

Melania had "vast domains in Sicily" and also held land in Britain which she disposed of only a year or two before the Roman legions were withdrawn. She also owned grand estates in Iberia, Africa, Numidia, Mauretania and Italy. Gerontius describes her estate in Sicily as follows:

Legacy
Today, the town of Sainte-Mélanie in Canada is named in her honour.

Hagiography 

An account of Melania's pursuit of the ascetic life survives in a hagiography or biography, written by Gerontius c. 452.

Further, there is an account of her life by Palladius (d. A.D. 431) as well.

Ancestry

See also 
 Evagrius Ponticus
 Jerome
 Rufius Antonius Agrypnius Volusianus

Notes

References

Sources

Further reading 
 Elizabeth A. Clark, The Life of Melania the Younger. New York, 1984.
 Rosemary Ruether, "Mothers of the Church: Ascetic Women in the Late Patristic Age," in Women of Spirit: Female Leadership in the Jewish and Christian Traditions, Rosemary Ruether and Eleanor McLaughlin, eds., New York, Simon and Schuster, 1979.

External links 
Orthodox Church in America

380s births
439 deaths
Year of birth uncertain
5th-century Byzantine women
4th-century Christian saints
5th-century Christian saints
4th-century Roman women
5th-century Roman women
Late Ancient Christian female saints
Valerii